Alban Joinel (born 14 September 1979) is a French former professional footballer who played as a goalkeeper. During a long playing career, Joinel represented numerous clubs in the French lower league. He also had a spell with Lorient between 2008 and 2011 where he made one appearance in Ligue 1, playing in the 0–1 home defeat against Nice on 8 November 2008.

External links
 
 Alban Joinel profile at foot-national.com
 

1979 births
Living people
People from Sarlat-la-Canéda
French footballers
Association football goalkeepers
ESA Brive players
Angoulême Charente FC players
SO Châtellerault players
Stade Poitevin FC players
USJA Carquefou players
FC Lorient players
Ligue 1 players
Championnat National players
Sportspeople from Dordogne
Footballers from Nouvelle-Aquitaine